Stokoe is a surname. Notable people with the surname include:

 Bob Stokoe (1930–2004), English footballer and manager
 Dennis Stokoe (1925–2005), English footballer
 Elizabeth Stokoe, British academic
 Graham Stokoe (born 1975), English former footballer
 James Stokoe (born 1985), Canadian comic book artist
 Jimmy Stokoe, (1888–1970), English footballer
 John Stokoe, Tyneside author and historian
 Matt Stokoe (born 1989), English actor
 Matthew Stokoe (born 1963), British writer and screenwriter
 T. H. Stokoe (1833–1903), English clergyman and headmaster
 William Stokoe (1919–2000), American sign language linguist
 William N. Stokoe (1892–1958), British organic chemist

See also
 Stokoe notation